This is the list of the railway stations in Trentino-Alto Adige/Südtirol owned by Rete Ferroviaria Italiana, a branch of the Italian state company Ferrovie dello Stato.

List

See also

Railway stations in Italy
Ferrovie dello Stato
Rail transport in Italy
High-speed rail in Italy
Transport in Italy

References

External links

 
Trentino-Alto Adige